Tenellia fructuosa is a species of sea slug, an aeolid nudibranch, a marine gastropod mollusc in the family Fionidae.

Distribution
This species was described from a single specimen taken on floating Sargassum in the Sargasso Sea.

References 

Fionidae
Gastropods described in 1892